Ronchi may refer to:

People
 Ronchi (name)

Places
Ronchi, a neighborhood in the town of Bra in Cuneo province in Italy's northwest Piedmont region near France
Ronchi, a frazione (hamlet) of Massa, Tuscany
Ronchi dei Legionari, a town in Italy near Trieste
Ronchi Valsugana, a comune (municipality) in the Province of Trento

Other uses
Rhonchi, abnormal sounds from the lungs indicating an abnormal medical condition
Ronchi test, a method of determining the figure of a mirror used in telescopes and other optical devices, invented by Vasco Ronchi
Ronchi ruling, a pattern for optical measurements like linear encoders

See also
Ronchis, a comune in the Province of Udine